Global University Bangladesh (GUB) is a private university located at Barisal, a city in south-central Bangladesh. The University Grants Commission of Bangladesh approved it in 2013 and it was established in 2015 under the Private University Act 2010. It is the first private university in Barisal Division.

History 
Global University Bangladesh was established in 2015. Three members of its board of trustees, including the chair, were relatives of then ruling party MP Jahangir Kabir Nanak. As of late 2016, the university's top three administrative positions were still vacant. Not until May 2019 was the vice chancellorship filled, by professor of philosophy Anisuzzaman. At that time enrollment was approximately 1,300. Land had been purchased for a permanent campus, but it was still operating out of a rented six-story building. As of February 2021, it has no permanent professors on the faculty.

It is accredited by the University Grants Commission (UGC) and approved by the Ministry of Education, Government of Bangladesh.

Academic programs

Faculty of Science and Engineering
Departments
 Electrical and electronic engineering
 Computer Science and Engineering
Undergraduate programs:
 B.Sc. in Electrical & Electronic Engineering (4 years )
 B.Sc. in Electrical & Electronic Engineering (Evening for Diploma holders - 44 months )
 B.Sc. in Computer Science & Engineering (4 years)
 B.Sc. in Computer Science & Engineering (Evening for Diploma holders - 44 months )

Faculty of Business Administration
Department
 Business Administration
Undergraduate programs:
 Bachelor of Business Administration (BBA)
Postgraduate programs:
 Master of Business Administration (Regular & BBA holder)
 Executive MBA (EMBA)

Faculty of Law
Department
 Law
Undergraduate programs:
 Bachelor of Laws [LL. B. (Hons.)]
Postgraduate programs:
 Master of Laws - BBB (For LLB Hons. 1 year)
 Master of Laws - LLM (For LLB Hons. 2 years)

Faculty of Arts and Social Science
Departments
 English
 Library and Information Science
Undergraduate programs:
 Bachelor of Arts in English (Hons.)
Postgraduate programs:
 MA in English
 Diploma in Library and Information Science, (1 Year)

See also 
 University of Barisal

References

External links 
 Official website

Private universities in Bangladesh
Educational institutions established in 2015
2015 establishments in Bangladesh